Qezel Hesar-e Pain (also Romanized as Qezel Ḩeşār-e Pā’īn and Quezel Ḩeşār Pā’īn; also known as Qezel Ḩeşār-e Soflá) is a village in Golestan Rural District, in the Central District of Jajrom County, North Khorasan Province, Iran. At the 2006 census, its population was 193, in 47 families.

References 

Populated places in Jajrom County